Charles P. West (May 2, 1921 – October 7, 2015) was an American politician. Born on the family farm in Gumboro Hundred, Delaware, he served in the United States Army during World War II. West was a farmer and carpenter, and a member of the United Brotherhood of Carpenters and Joiners. From 1957 to 1959 and then from 1977 to 2003, he served in the Delaware House of Representatives as a Democrat. West died at his home in Gumboro, Delaware.

References

1921 births
2015 deaths
People from Sussex County, Delaware
American carpenters
Farmers from Delaware
Democratic Party members of the Delaware House of Representatives
United States Army personnel of World War II
United States Army soldiers